Sirine can refer to:

Sirine (Dungeons & Dragons), Advanced Dungeons & Dragons 1st edition monster
Širine, a settlement in Croatian Baranja